The  Asian Men's Volleyball Championship was the seventh staging of the Asian Men's Volleyball Championship, a biennial international volleyball tournament organised by the Asian Volleyball Confederation (AVC) with Thailand Volleyball Association (TVA). The tournament was held in Nakhon Ratchasima, Thailand from 11 to 19 September 1993.

Preliminary round

Pool A

|}

|}

Pool B

|}

|}

Pool C

|}

|}

Pool D

|}

|}

Quarterfinals
 The results and the points of the matches between the same teams that were already played during the preliminary round shall be taken into account for the Quarter-finals.

Pool E

|}

|}

Pool F

|}

|}

Final round
Classification 5th–8th

5th-8th place semifinals

|}

7th place

|}

5th place

|}

Championship

Semifinals

|}

3rd place match

|}

Final

|}

Final standing

References
Results

A
V
V
Asian men's volleyball championships